Panther Creek is a large creek (or small river) in the U.S. state of Illinois. The largest town in the Panther Creek drainage is El Paso, Illinois.

Panther Creek drains much of eastern Woodford County.
The creek flows through a region of intense corn and soybean cultivation, formerly part of the Illinois Grande Prairie.  Together with the rest of the Mackinaw River's drainage, the creek ultimately feeds the lower Illinois River.

This Panther Creek should not be confused with a much smaller Panther Creek in Cass County, which flows through the Jim Edgar Panther Creek State Fish and Wildlife Area.

See also
 List of Illinois rivers

References

Rivers of Illinois
Rivers of Woodford County, Illinois
Tributaries of the Illinois River